Aliabad Musaviyeh (also Romanized as ‘Alīābād Mūsavīyeh; also known as ‘Alīābād) is a village in Afriz Rural District, Sedeh District, Qaen County, South Khorasan Province, Iran. At the 2006 census, its population was 277, in 71 families.

References 

Populated places in Qaen County